The men's high jump at the 2010 European Athletics Championships was held at the Estadi Olímpic Lluís Companys on 27 and 29 July.

Medalists

Records

Schedule

Results

Qualification
Qualification: Qualification Performance 2.28 (Q) or at least 12 best performers advance to the final

Final

References

 Qualification Results
Final Results
Full results

High jump
High jump at the European Athletics Championships